Lenzites is a widespread genus of wood-decay fungi in the family Polyporaceae. It was circumscribed by Elias Magnus Fries in 1835. The generic name honours German naturalist Harald Othmar Lenz (1798–1870).

Species
A 2008 estimate placed 6 species in Lenzites. , Index Fungorum accepts 26 species:
Lenzites alba Beeli (1929)
Lenzites alborepanda Lloyd (1923)
Lenzites aurea Velen. (1930)
Lenzites betulina (L.) Fr. (1838)
Lenzites britzelmayrii Killerm. (1925)
Lenzites cinnabarina Imbach (1946)
Lenzites earlei Murrill (1908)
Lenzites ferruginea (F.C.Harrison) Sacc. & Trotter (1912)
Lenzites flabelliformis L.M.Dufour (1913)
Lenzites glabra Lloyd (1919)
Lenzites glabrescens (Berk.) G.Cunn. (1950)
Lenzites kusanoi (Murrill) Teng (1964)
Lenzites leveillei Pat. (1900)
Lenzites lutescens Syd. & P.Syd. (1900)
Lenzites muelleri (Berk. ex Cooke) Lloyd (1919)
Lenzites nummularia Lohwag (1937)
Lenzites pergamenea Pat. (1914)
Lenzites shichiana (Teng & L.Ling) Teng (1964)
Lenzites spegazzinii Bres. (1926)
Lenzites stereoides (Fr.) Ryvarden (1972)
Lenzites styracina (Henn. & Shirai) Lloyd (1919)
Lenzites thermophila O.Falck (1909)
Lenzites trabeiformis (Murrill) Murrill (1912)
Lenzites undulata (Hoffm.) Sacc. & Traverso (1912)
Lenzites yoshinagae Lloyd (1922)

References

Polyporaceae
Polyporales genera
Taxa named by Elias Magnus Fries
Fungi described in 1835